The 2008–09 season was Norwich City's fourth consecutive year in the Football League Championship. On 3 May 2009, the club was relegated to play League One football for the first time in 49 years after losing 4–2 to Charlton Athletic and finishing in 22nd place. This article shows statistics and lists all matches played by the club during the season.

Club sponsors
From 26 April 2008, it was announced that Flybe would be stepping down as the main club sponsor. On 29 April 2008 it was announced that Aviva would be the new shirt sponsors, having signed a three-year contract. Aviva are the parent company of Norwich Union.

Board changes
On 2 September 2008, Andrew and Sharon Turner announced that they were leaving the football club's board of directors. This left a £2 million hole in Norwich City's budget. On 4 September 2008, Delia Smith and Michael Wynn Jones announced that they would be injecting £2 million, avoiding financial problems for the club.

Board and staff members

Board members

Coaching staff

Players

First-team squad
Squad at end of season

Left club during season

Transfers

In

Out

* Indicates player joined club after being released by Norwich City

Loans in

Loans out

Results by round

Competitions

Pre-season

League

August

September

October

November

December

January

February

March

April

May

FA Cup

League Cup

League table

Notes

References

2008-09
Norwich City